

Playoff seedings, results, and schedules

Quarter-finals

(1) TAU Cerámica (26-8) vs. (8) Unicaja Málaga (17-17)
  TAU Cerámica win the series 3-0
Game 1 18 May @ Vitoria-Gasteiz: TAU Cerámica 92, Unicaja Málaga 65
Game 2 20 May @ Málaga: Unicaja Málaga 66, TAU Cerámica 82
Game 3 25 May @ Vitoria-Gasteiz: TAU Cerámica 88, Unicaja Málaga 63

(4) Winterthur FCB (23-11) vs. (5) Akasvayu Girona (21-13)
 Winterthur FCB win the series 3-1 
Game 1 18 May @ Barcelona: Winterthur FCB 80, Akasvayu Girona 69
Game 2 20 May @ Girona: Akasvayu Girona 85, Winterthur FCB 70
Game 3 25 May @ Barcelona: Winterthur FCB 84, Akasvayu Girona 77
Game 4 27 May @ Girona:Akasvayu Girona 75, Winterthur FCB 90

(2) Real Madrid (25-9)  vs. (7) Pamesa Valencia (19-15)
 Real Madrid win the series 3-1
Game 1 17 May @ Madrid: Real Madrid 84, Pamesa Valencia 81
Game 2 19 May @ Valencia: Pamesa Valencia 70, Real Madrid 67
Game 3 24 May @ Madrid: Real Madrid 100, Pamesa Valencia 79
Game 4 26 May @ Valencia: Pamesa Valencia 80, Real Madrid 83

(3) DKV Joventut (23-11) vs. (6) Gran Canaria Grupo Dunas (21-13)
 DKV Joventut win the series 3-2
Game 1 18 May @ Badalona: DKV Joventut 75, Gran Canaria Grupo Dunas 73
Game 2 20 May @ Las Palmas de Gran Canaria: Gran Canaria Grupo Dunas 71, DKV Joventut 80
Game 3 25 May @ Badalona: DKV Joventut 63, Gran Canaria Grupo Dunas 74
Game 4 27 May @ Las Palmas de Gran Canaria: Gran Canaria Grupo Dunas 74, Joventut 71
Game 5 29 May @ Badalona: DKV Joventut 93, Gran Canaria Grupo Dunas 76

Semifinals
These four teams classified for the semifinals will play the Euroleague for the 2007/2008 season.
The other best two teams are classified for the ULEB Cup.

(1) TAU Cerámica (26-8) vs. (4) Winterthur FCB (23-11)
 Winterthur FCB win the series 3-2
Game 1 1 June @ Vitoria-Gasteiz: TAU Cerámica 81, Winterthur FCB 73
Game 2 3 June @ Vitoria-Gasteiz: TAU Cerámica 76, Winterthur FCB 83
Game 3 8 June @ Barcelona: Winterthur FCB 80, TAU Cerámica 78
Game 4 10 June @ Barcelona: Winterthur FCB 71, TAU Cerámica 77
Game 5 12 June @ Vitoria-Gasteiz: TAU Cerámica 79, Winterthur FCB 95

(2) Real Madrid (25-9)  vs. (3) DKV Joventut (23-11)
 Real Madrid win the series 3-2
Game 1 31 May @ Madrid: Real Madrid 72, DKV Joventut 70
Game 2 3 June @ Madrid: Real Madrid 69, DKV Joventut 76
Game 3 7 June @ Badalona:DKV Joventut 85, Real Madrid 71
Game 4 10 June @ Badalona: DKV Joventut 70, Real Madrid 72
Game 5 12 June @ Madrid: Real Madrid 65, DKV Joventut 61

ACB Finals
(2) Real Madrid (25-9) vs. (4) Winterthur FCB (23-11)
 Real Madrid win the series 3-1 and the championship
Game 1 June 17 @ Madrid: Real Madrid 69, Winterthur FCB 62
Game 2 June 19 @ Madrid: Real Madrid 83, Winterthur FCB 80
Game 3 June 22 @ Barcelona: Winterthur FCB 75, Real Madrid 70
Game 4 June 24 @ Barcelona: Winterthur FCB 71, Real Madrid 83
REAL MADRID BALONCESTO: 2006/2007 ACB CHAMPION

MVP
 Felipe Reyes – Real Madrid

TV coverage
TVE2
Teledeporte
FORTA

External links
Official Schedule and Results

Liga ACB playoffs
Playoffs